Alfonso Rodríguez (born 23 December 1965) is a Spanish gymnast. He competed at the 1984 Summer Olympics, the 1988 Summer Olympics and the 1992 Summer Olympics.

References

1965 births
Living people
Spanish male artistic gymnasts
Olympic gymnasts of Spain
Gymnasts at the 1984 Summer Olympics
Gymnasts at the 1988 Summer Olympics
Gymnasts at the 1992 Summer Olympics
Gymnasts from Madrid
20th-century Spanish people
21st-century Spanish people